Veerapandi is a panchayat town in Coimbatore district in the Indian state of Tamil Nadu.

Demographics
 India census, Veerapandi had a population of 12,141. Males constitute 53% of the population and females 47%. Veerapandi has an average literacy rate of 70%, higher than the national average of 59.5%: male literacy is 77%, and female literacy is 63%. In Veerapandi, 9% of the population is under 6 years of age.

References

Cities and towns in Coimbatore district
Suburbs of Coimbatore